Avondale Bridge was located in Avondale, Colorado spanning the Arkansas River. It was listed on the National Historic Register of Places. It was a Luten Arch bridge built by the Pueblo Bridge Co.  It was replaced in 2005.

See also
 
 
 
 
 List of crossings of the Arkansas River
 National Register of Historic Places listings in Pueblo County, Colorado

References

Road bridges on the National Register of Historic Places in Colorado
Bridges completed in 1913
Transportation buildings and structures in Pueblo County, Colorado
Bridges over the Arkansas River
1913 establishments in Colorado
National Register of Historic Places in Pueblo County, Colorado
Arch bridges in the United States
Luten bridges